Dr. Franz Heinrich Zitz (November 18, 1803 in Mainz – April 30, 1877) was a prominent Mainz attorney and enjoyed much success with women due to his comeliness.  He was a restless and at times dissolute man.  On June 3, 1837, he married the writer Katharina Theresa Halein, not completely of his own free will, but under threat of suicide. They lived together two years and remained married for the rest of their lives.  As a member of the Frankfurt parliament, Franz played a respected role on the far left, and as the head of the militia in Mainz he was highly esteemed and trusted by the people of that town.  He sported a remarkably full and unkempt beard during the 1849 uprising, and when it failed, toward the end of that year, he emigrated to America, settling in New York as a notary, a partner in the firm Kapp, Zitz and Fröbel.  When amnesty was offered, he returned to Europe and died in Munich.

References 

Carl Schurz, Reminiscences (3 volumes), New York: The McClure Company, 1907.  Schurz meets Franz Zitz as a revolutionary leader in the Palatinate town of Kircheimbolander in Chapter VII of Volume One.  He reports that “Mr. Zitz, a few years later, was well known in New York as a member of the law firm of Zitz & Kapp.”

1803 births
1877 deaths
Politicians from Mainz
19th-century German lawyers
German revolutionaries
German-American Forty-Eighters
University of Giessen alumni
University of Göttingen alumni
People from Rhenish Hesse
20th-century Freikorps personnel